Nicole Barber-Lane is a British actress known for playing Myra McQueen in the long-running teen soap Hollyoaks.

Career
Before working in Hollyoaks, Barber-Lane appeared in Emmerdale, Bodies, The Cops, and in a Yorkshire Building Society commercial.  She has featured in Woman, Red and NOW magazines. Barber-Lane has also appeared in theatres such as The Dance House Theatre, The Courtyard Theatre and The Robert Powell Theatre. She has also performed at the Bridgewater Hall in Manchester.

She is also one of the many celebrities who have teamed up with Cancer Research UK to re-release "Girls Just Want to Have Fun". On 27 March 2019, Barber-Lane left Hollyoaks after thirteen years on the show when her character Myra moved to Spain.

Personal life
Lane married actor Liam Fox in 1999. They have two children together. In February 2015, they announced that they were to divorce.

References

External links

Year of birth missing (living people)
British stage actresses
British television actresses
Living people
Place of birth missing (living people)
21st-century British actresses
English soap opera actresses
British soap opera actresses
21st-century English women
21st-century English people